Eupithecia bicubitata is a moth in the  family Geometridae. It is found in Peru.

The wingspan is about 28 mm for females. The forewings are glossy white, clouded with greyish fuscous and irrorated with darker fuscous. The hindwings are dirty whitish, suffused with greyish fuscous.

References

Moths described in 1916
bicubitata
Moths of South America